Bharia is one of Dravidian-speaking tribes of Madhya Pradesh in India. The Bharias live in Patalkot, which is completely isolated valley some 400 metres below Tamia in Chhindwara district of Madhya Pradesh. This valley is the source of Dudhi River. Patalkot is totally inaccessible by road and one enters along a footpath only. But recently The Madhya Pradesh government established good road inside the Patalkot valley.

There are hundreds of  medicinal plant species in the Patalkot valley, and the Bharias have a deep knowledge of the herbs and medicinal plants growing within their valley. Herbal healers from Bharia community are known as Bhagats. According to Deepak Acharya, Bhumkas can treat various human disorders.

See also
Bharia language

References

External links
Patalkot.com

Social groups of India
Social groups of Madhya Pradesh
Chhindwara